Iaccarino is a surname. Notable people with the surname include:

Alejandro Iaccarino (born 1946), Argentine businessman
Michael L. Iaccarino, American chief executive